Benjamin Mink  (born January 22, 1951) is a Canadian songwriter, multi-instrumentalist, and producer best known as a longtime collaborator of Canadian singer k.d. lang. He plays several string instruments, notably the guitar, violin, and the mandolin, and is a music producer. He lives in Vancouver.

Life and career

Early work
Born to Polish Holocaust survivors, Mink was raised in Toronto, Ontario. He got his start performing with the rock/country group Mary-Lou Horner, which became the house band at The Rockpile bar and nightclub and acted as a backup band for Chuck Berry.

He has been a member of the groups Stringband, Murray McLauchlan's Silver Tractors, and FM.

k.d. lang
Mink is best known as a longtime collaborator of Canadian singer k.d. lang, whom he met at Expo '85 while doing a gig with CANO. Mink has performed on, along with co-writing and producing, several of her albums, which often combine voice with string arrangements. Mink subsequently performed as violinist, guitarist, and mandolinist with lang's band, the Reclines. A performance for the Grammy-nominated album Ingénue was recorded as part of the MTV Unplugged series at the Ed Sullivan Theater, New York City, on December 16, 1992.
Mink was interviewed about his songwriting collaboration with lang on the British television show South Bank Show in 1996.

Rush
Mink was invited to play electric violin on the Rush song "Losing It" from their 1982 album Signals, and contributed strings to the song "Faithless" from the 2007 album Snakes & Arrows. He also co-wrote, produced, and played guitar on My Favourite Headache (2000), a solo project of Rush lead singer and bassist Geddy Lee.
On June 19, 2015, he performed "Losing It" with the trio at the Air Canada Centre in Toronto, as part of their R40 Live Tour.

Other collaborations
Mink has also produced and/or performed on recordings by  the Barenaked Ladies, Anne Murray, Dan Hill, Mendelson Joe, Prairie Oyster, Raffi, Jane Siberry, Ian and Sylvia Tyson, Valdy, Bruce Cockburn, Murray McLauchlan, Willie P. Bennett, Susan Aglukark, Methodman, Alison Krauss, Feist, Daniel Lanois, Sarah McLachlan, Roy Orbison, Elton John, and Heart.

He co-produced Red Velvet Car for Heart's Ann and Nancy Wilson, released in the fall of 2010, and appeared onstage in the band's concert video Night at Sky Church. Mink was back at the helm as producer of Heart's 2012 album Fanatic, which included the single "Walkin' Good", featuring Sarah McLachlan.

Mink co-produced and performed on Feist's Grammy-nominated hit single "1-2-3-4", playing strings and guitars.

He is a member of the Black Sea Station, a North American klezmer supergroup. Their debut recording, Transylvania Avenue, is produced by Mink, and was released on Rounder Records in the Fall of 2010 as a digital download. He has also produced other klezmer musical acts in the past, such as Finjan, The Klezmatics, and Chava Alberstein.

Soundtracks
Mink scored the 2007 biopic Confessions of an Innocent Man about British-Canadian engineer William Sampson, which garnered him a Gemini Award.
He wrote the soundtrack to the film Fifty Dead Men Walking, which has since received numerous awards and nominations, including a 2010 Genie Award nomination for Best Achievement in Music—Original Score, and a 2009 Leo Award for Best Musical Score for a Feature-Length Drama. The television soundtracks for Terminal City and Alice both also garnered
Leo Awards.
In 2011, the TV series Glee used the 1992 song "Constant Craving", written by Mink and k.d. lang, in the seventh episode of the third season, for its closing number (performed by Chris Colfer, Idina Menzel and Naya Rivera).

Other work
Mink has lectured on such topics as "The Music Business vs. the Creative Process" at the University of British Columbia, Western Washington University, and Simon Fraser University. He has also worked with students as an associate of UBC's Department of Mechanical Engineering (robotics) and is an associate member of the Institute for Computing, Information & Cognitive Systems. In 2006, he delivered the introductory speech to k.d. lang's Governor General's Performing Arts Award induction at the National Arts Centre in Ottawa. He has also contributed to the Library and Archives Canada.

Mink is one of few people to ever share a songwriting credit with Mick Jagger and Keith Richards. In 1997, Mink and k.d. lang were co-credited as songwriters on the Rolling Stones single "Anybody Seen My Baby?" because Jagger-Richards felt the chorus was very similar to "Constant Craving".

Mink has one solo recording—the hard-to-find 1980 release Foreign Exchange, on Passport Records.

Selected awards
 Grammy Awards: In 1990, Mink was co-nominated with k.d. lang for a Best Country Song Grammy for "Luck in My Eyes". Subsequently, as a producer and writer, he has been nominated for a total of nine Grammies, winning twice for his work with lang.
 Juno Awards: He has received seven Juno nominations, winning three times between 1993 and 1994.
 Genie/Gemini Awards: Genie Award – Best Original Score for 50 Dead Men Walking; Gemini Award – Best British Columbia Film for Confessions of an Innocent Man.
 Leo Awards: Best Musical Score 2006, 2009, 2010.

References

External links
 
 
 
 

1951 births
Canadian songwriters
Canadian rock violinists
Canadian record producers
Canadian mandolinists
Musicians from Toronto
Canadian emigrants to the United States
Canadian people of Polish-Jewish descent
Musicians from Cleveland
Living people
Juno Award for Songwriter of the Year winners
Songwriters from Ohio
20th-century Canadian guitarists
21st-century Canadian guitarists
Electric violinists
Jack Richardson Producer of the Year Award winners
20th-century Canadian violinists and fiddlers
21st-century Canadian violinists and fiddlers
20th-century Canadian male musicians
21st-century Canadian male musicians
Jewish Canadian musicians
Canadian male violinists and fiddlers
Canadian male guitarists
Members of the Order of Canada
Musicians from Vancouver